The Nona River is a sub-tributary of the Brahmaputra River in the Indian state of Assam. The Nona River originates in the hills of Samdrup Jongkhar and flows through Baksa district and Nalbari district in Assam before its confluence with the Baralia River.

References 

Rivers of Assam
Rivers of India